The shipwreck of Rochelongue, located west of Cap d'Agde in southwestern France, dates to the Iron Age, c. 600 BCE. Its cargo included 800 kg of copper ingots and about 1,700 bronze artefacts. The ingots have been analysed by the SAM-Project. They contain very pure copper with traces of lead, antimony, nickel and silver.

Further reading
 Parker, A. J.,Ancient Shipwrecks of the Mediterranean & the Roman Provinces, Archaeopress, Oxford, 1992, 

Rochelongue, Wreck of
Rochelongue, Wreck of